The 2020 United States presidential election in Oregon was held on Tuesday, November 3, 2020, as part of the 2020 United States presidential election in which all 50 states plus the District of Columbia participated. President Donald Trump, and Vice President Mike Pence were renominated by the Republican Party. They faced a Democratic Party ticket of former Vice President Joe Biden, and his running mate, California U.S. Senator Kamala Harris, as vice president. 

Biden won 56.45% of the vote to 40.37% for Trump. Biden received Oregon's seven electoral votes in the Electoral College. The state certified its election results on December 3.

Biden won Oregon by 16.1%, an increase from Hillary Clinton's 11% victory margin in 2016. No Republican presidential candidate has won Oregon since Ronald Reagan of neighboring California in 1984. Biden flipped two counties Trump won in 2016: Marion County-home to the state capital of Salem, and Deschutes County-anchored by fast-growing Bend. It was also the first time a majority of Deschutes County voted for a Democrat since Lyndon Johnson in 1964. 

Biden was the first Democrat since Woodrow Wilson to win the presidency without carrying Columbia County and Tillamook County. He also became the first non-incumbent Democrat since Jimmy Carter to get elected without carrying Jackson County, and the first non-incumbent presidential candidate since George H. W. Bush to win without carrying Wasco. Tillamook and Columbia counties were among a fraction of the more than 3,000 counties in the U.S. to vote twice for Barack Obama (2008, 2012) and twice for Donald Trump (2016, 2020).

Biden also made history as the highest vote earner in Oregon history, with 1,340,383 votes.

Per exit polls by the Associated Press, 33% of voters were secular and supported Biden by 80%.

Primary elections
The Oregon primary elections were held on Tuesday, May 19, 2020.

Republican primary
Donald Trump ran unopposed in Oregon, receiving the state's 28 delegates to the Republican National Convention

Democratic primary
Though all Democrats but Joe Biden had withdrawn from the national race by the Oregon primary, four remained on the ballot. Biden won just under two-thirds of the vote. Bernie Sanders received just over 20% of the vote. Oregon's 71 delegates were allocated with 46 to Biden and 15 to Sanders.

Independent Party of Oregon primary
The Independent Party of Oregon cross-nominated Joe Biden after an online nonpartisan blanket primary.

Pacific Green Party primary
Howie Hawkins won the Oregon Green Party primary.

General election

Final predictions

Polling

Graphical summary

Polls
Aggregate polls

Polls

Results

By county

Counties that flipped from Republican to Democratic
Deschutes (largest municipality: Bend)
Marion (largest municipality: Salem)

By congressional district
Biden won 4 out of 5 congressional districts in Oregon.

See also
 United States presidential elections in Oregon
 Presidency of Joe Biden
 2020 United States presidential election
 2020 Democratic Party presidential primaries
 2020 Republican Party presidential primaries
 2020 United States elections

Notes

References

External links
 
 
  (State affiliate of the U.S. League of Women Voters)
 

Oregon
2020
Presidential